Bo Fredrik Björck (born 22 October 1979) is a retired Swedish footballer who played as a defender and current head coach of Västra Frölunda IF.

Career

Club career
He joined Helsingborgs IF before the start of the 2005 season, transferred from newly relegated AIK. A central defender, Björck has had injury problems during his time at HIF and the team has only been able to use him irregularly. When not injured, he has proven to be a stable player with a very powerful shot. Previously, he has also played for Västra Frölunda IF and as a youngster for Kållered SK and IFK Göteborg.

In the autumn of 2008 he was made captain of Esbjerg fB. On 4 February 2010 it was announced that he had signed a contract with Norwegian Tippeliga team Tromsø IL, after failing a medical test with Tippeligaen rivals, Aalesunds FK.

Coaching career
On 25 August 2017, Björck was appointed player-assistant to newly appointed manager Sören Börjesson. Retiring at the end of the 2017 season, he continued with his assistant coach duties for Örgryte IS. He left the position on 3 January 2019.

In December 2019 it was confirmed, that Björck had been appointed joint-head coach of Västra Frölunda IF alongside Adam Ekblad. Björck's former teammate, Dime Jankulovski, also joined the coaching staff as his assistant coach.

Career statistics

References

Guardian Football

External links
Esbjerg fB profile

Living people
1979 births
Swedish footballers
AIK Fotboll players
IF Elfsborg players
IFK Göteborg players
Esbjerg fB players
Allsvenskan players
Superettan players
Västra Frölunda IF players
Helsingborgs IF players
Tromsø IL players
Eliteserien players
Danish Superliga players
Swedish expatriate footballers
Expatriate men's footballers in Denmark
Expatriate footballers in Norway
Swedish expatriate sportspeople in Norway
Swedish expatriate sportspeople in Denmark
Association football defenders
Swedish football managers